The Fender Prophecy II Bass was a Japanese-made, limited-edition bass guitar which was a significant departure from the well-known traditional Precision Bass and Jazz Bass.  It was actually produced by Heartfield (a subsidiary of Fender) in Japan's Fujigen Gakki factory. 

Unique features of the bass include a double-pointed 2-and-2 headstock painted black (rather than the trademark natural-finish Fender 4-on-top headstock), and a 22-fret neck with a smoothly carved bolt-on neck joint body-through heel. The body loosely resembles a thinline jazz body with a longer strap horn without a pickguard or metal knob-plate.  The hardware was gold and the paint was translucent on the body and the back of the neck.

The electronics were active with covered passive pickups, set up like a Precision Bass Special (a split-coil humbucker at center, and single-coil jazz pickup at bridge).  The knobs are set up in a diamond pattern under the bridge and bridge pickup.  The knobs represented Volume, Trim/Pot, Bass and Treble.

The Prophecy I featured a basswood body and passive electronics while the Prophecy III employed a neck-through-body design.

References

External links 
Review on Harmony Central

Online reference for Heartfield Guitars, Basses and Company Info

P